Van den Broeck or Vandenbroeck is a Dutch toponymic surname most common in the Belgian provinces of Antwerp and East Flanders. "Broeck" is an archaic spelling of  "broek" meaning "swamp". Notable people with the surname include:

Arthur Moeller van den Bruck (1876–1925), German historian and writer
Ann Van den Broeck (born 1976), Belgian actress and musician
Charles Van den Broeck, Belgian tug of war competitor and Olympian
 Charlotte Van den Broeck (nl), Belgian poet
Clemens van den Broeck (born 1943), Dutch goldsmith, sculptor and craftsman
Chrispijn van den Broeck (1523–1591), Flemish painter
David Vandenbroeck (born 1985), Belgian footballer
Elias van den Broeck (1649–1708), Dutch Golden Age painter
Hendrick van den Broeck (1519–1597), Flemish painter and brother of Willem van den Broecke
Jan van den Broeck (b. 1989), Belgian middle-distance runner
Jonathan Vandenbroeck (b. 1981), Belgian singer-songwriter known as "Milow"
Joris Pieters van den Broeck (1610–1652), Frisian sailor in the service of the Admiralty of Friesland
Jurgen Van den Broeck (born 1983), Belgian cyclist
Nicole Vandenbroeck (b. 1946), Belgian road race cyclist
Paul Van den Broeck (1904 – after 1924), Belgian bobsledder and ice hockey player
Remi Van den Broeck, Belgian businessman
 Rob van den Broeck (de; 1940–2012), Dutch jazz pianist and composer
Walter van den Broeck (born 1941), Belgian writer and playwright

Van den Broecke:
Lily van den Broecke (b. 1992), British rower
Pieter van den Broecke (1585–1640), Dutch cloth merchant in the service of the Dutch East India Company
Willem van den Broecke (1530–1579), Flemish sculptor, painter, draughtsman and architect and brother of Hendrick van den Broeck
 Pongky van den Broecke (b. 1958), ‘The Last Parkenier’, Indonesian descendant of Paulus van den Broecke brother of Pieter van den Broecke, managed 12.5 ha of nutmeg plantation.

See also
 Broucke
 Van den Broek
 Vandenbroucke

References

Dutch-language surnames
Surnames of Belgian origin
Surnames of Dutch origin